Georg Friedrich List (6 August 1789 – 30 November 1846) was a German-American economist and political theorist who developed the nationalist theory of political economy in both Europe and the United States. He was a forefather of the German historical school of economics and argued for the Zollverein (a pan-German customs union) from a nationalist standpoint. He advocated raising tariffs on imported goods while supporting free trade of domestic goods and stated the cost of a tariff should be seen as an investment in a nation's future productivity.

At the time in Europe, liberal and nationalist ideas were almost inseparably linked, and political liberalism was not yet attached to what was later considered "economic liberalism." Emmanuel Todd considers List a forerunner to John Maynard Keynes as a theorist of "moderate or regulated capitalism."

Biography

Early life
List was born in the free imperial city of Reutlingen in the Duchy of Württemberg on August 6, 1789. His father, Johannes, was a prosperous master tanner and a city official, and Georg Friedrich was the second son and youngest child in his family. He was educated at the town's Latin School. In an apprenticeship at his father's tanning business, List showed little interest in manual labor. He was apprenticed as a bureaucratic clerk at Blaubeuren. After passing his examination, he became Taxes and Warehouses Commissioner in Schelklingen.

University of Tübingen
At age 23, List was promoted to a post at Tübingen. While there, he regularly attended lectures at the University of Tübingen and expanded his reading. He also made the acquaintance of the future minister . In 1816, List's position in the bureaucracy was improved as the succession of King William I of Württemberg ushered in a period of reform. Under minister , List rose quickly through the bureaucracy and was made the first Professor of Administration and Politics at the University. List had been an advocate for establishing such a position, arguing in 1817:

"No one in our University has any conception of a national economy. No one teaches the science of agriculture, forestry, mining, industry, or trade. ... [T]he forms of government are in such a truly barbarous state, that if an official of the seventeenth century rose again from the dead he could at once take up his old work, though he would assuredly be astonished to find the advances that had been made during the interval in the simplest process of manufacture."

As a deputy to the Württemberg chamber, he was active in advocating administrative reforms. He was eventually expelled from the chamber and in April 1822 sentenced to ten months' imprisonment with hard labor in the fortress of Asperg. He escaped to Alsace, and after visiting France and England returned in 1824 to finish his sentence, and was released on undertaking to emigrate to America.

Move to United States: 1825–1830
Arriving in the United States in 1825, he settled in Pennsylvania, where he became an extensive landholder. He first engaged in farming, but soon switched to  journalism and edited a German paper in Reading. He was active in the establishment of railroads.
Some argue (e.g. Chang, 2002) that it was in America that he gathered from a study of Alexander Hamilton's work the inspiration which made him an economist of his pronounced "National System" views which found realization in Henry Clay's American System. Others deny this (Daastøl, 2011), since he argued for a German customs union already in 1819, when he established the first German union for industry and trade. List's ideas on protectionism predate his American sojourn, and were influenced by liberal protectionists such as Adolphe Thiers. The main theoretical reference approvingly cited by List in his 1827 pamphlet Outlines of American Political Economy, in which he defended the doctrine of pragmatic protection and free trade, was Jean-Antoine Chaptal’s De l’industrie française (1819). The discovery of coal on some land which he had acquired made him financially independent.

Return to Europe: 1831–1846
In 1830, he was appointed United States consul at Hamburg, but on his arrival in Europe he found that the Senate had failed to confirm his appointment. After residing for some time in Paris, he returned to Pennsylvania. He next settled in Leipzig in 1833, where for some time he was U.S. consul. He was a journalist in Paris from 1837 to 1843, where he wrote articles for Thiers's centre-left paper Le Constitutionnel. He wrote several letters for the Augsburg Allgemeine Zeitung, which were published in 1841 in a volume under the title of Das nationale System der politischen Oekonomie.

In 1841, his ill health had led him to decline an offer to edit the Rheinische Zeitung, a new Cologne paper of liberal views, and Karl Marx took the post. In 1843, he established the Zollvereinsblatt in Augsburg, a newspaper in which he advocated the enlargement of the customs union, and the organization of a national commercial system. He strongly advocated the extension of the railway system in Germany. The development of the Zollverein to where it unified Germany economically was due largely to his enthusiasm and ardour.

He visited Austria and Hungary in 1844.

In 1846, he visited England with a view to forming a commercial alliance between that country and Germany but was unsuccessful. His last days were darkened by many misfortunes; he lost much of his American property in a financial crisis, ill-health also overtook him, and he killed himself in Kufstein on 30 November 1846.

Views

Nationalist view of political economy

List's theory of "national economics" differed from the doctrines of "individual economics" and "cosmopolitan economics" by Adam Smith and J.B. Say. List contrasted the economic behaviour of an individual with that of a nation. An individual promotes only his own personal interests but a state fosters the welfare of all its citizens. An individual may prosper from activities which harm the interests of a nation. "Slavery may be a public calamity for a country, nevertheless some people may do very well in carrying on the slave trade and in holding slaves." Likewise, activities beneficial to society may injure the interests of certain individuals. "Canals and railroads may do great good to a nation, but all waggoners will complain of this improvement. Every new invention has some inconvenience for a number of individuals, and is nevertheless a public blessing".  List argued that although some government action was essential to stimulate the economy, an overzealous government might do more harm than good. "It is bad policy to regulate everything and to promote everything by employing social powers, where things may better regulate themselves and can be better promoted by private exertions; but it is no less bad policy to let those things alone which can only be promoted by interfering social power."

Due to the "universal union" that nations have with their populace, List stated that "from this political union originates their commercial union, and it is in consequence of the perpetual peace thus maintained that commercial union has become so beneficial to them. ...  The result of a general free trade would not be a universal republic, but, on the contrary, a universal subjection of the less advanced nations to the predominant manufacturing, commercial and naval power, is a conclusion for which the reasons are very strong. ... A universal republic ... , i.e. a union of the nations of the earth whereby they recognise the same conditions of right among themselves and renounce self-redress, can only be realised if a large number of nationalities attain to as nearly the same degree as possible of industry and civilisation, political cultivation and power. Only with the gradual formation of this union can free trade be developed; only as a result of this union can it confer on all nations the same great advantages which are now experienced by those provinces and states which are politically united. The system of protection, inasmuch as it forms the only means of placing those nations which are far behind in civilisation on equal terms with the one predominating nation, appears to be the most efficient means of furthering the final union of nations, and hence also of promoting true freedom of trade."

In his seventh letter List repeated his assertion that economists should realise that since the human race is divided into independent states, "a nation would act unwisely to endeavour to promote the welfare of the whole human race at the expense of its particular strength, welfare, and independence. It is a dictate of the law of self-preservation to make its particular advancement in power and strength the first principles of its policy". A country should not count the cost of defending the overseas trade of its merchants.  And "the manufacturing and agricultural interest must be promoted and protected even by sacrifices of the majority of the individuals, if it can be proved that the nation would never acquire the necessary perfection ... without such protective measures."

List argued that international trade reduced the security of the states who took part in it.

List argued that statesmen had two responsibilities: "one to contemporary society and one to future generations".  Normally, the attention of most leaders is occupied by urgent matters, leaving little time to consider future problems. But when a country had reached a turning point in its development, its leaders were morally obliged to deal with issues that would affect the next generation. "On the threshold of a new phase in the development of their country, statesmen should be prepared to take the long view, despite the need to deal also with matters of immediate urgency."

List's fundamental doctrine was that a nation's true wealth is the full and many-sided development of its productive power, rather than its current exchange values. For example, its economic education should be more important than immediate production of value, and it might be right that one generation should sacrifice its gain and enjoyment to secure the strength and skill of the future. Under normal conditions, an economically mature nation should also develop agriculture, manufacture and commerce. However, the last two factors were more important since they better influenced the nation's culture and independence and were especially connected to navigation, railways and high technology, and a purely-agricultural state tended to stagnate

However, List claimed that only countries in temperate regions were adapted to grow higher forms of industry. On the other hand, tropical regions had a natural monopoly in the production of certain raw materials. Thus, there were a spontaneous division of labor and a confederation of powers between both groups of countries.

List contended that Smith's economic system is not an industrial system but a mercantile system, and he called it "the exchange-value system". Contrary to Smith, he argued that the immediate private interest of individuals would not lead to the highest good of society. The nation stood between the individual and humanity, and was defined by its language, manners, historical development, culture and constitution. The unity must be the first condition of the security, well-being, progress and civilization of the individual. Private economic interests, like all others, must be subordinated to the maintenance, completion and strengthening of the nation.

Stages of economic development
List theorised that nations of the temperate zone (which are furnished with all the necessary conditions) naturally pass through stages of economic development in advancing to their normal economic state. These are:
 Pastoral life
 Agriculture
 Agriculture united with manufactures
 Agriculture, manufactures and commerce are combined

The progress of the nation through these stages is the task of the state, which must create the required conditions for the progress by using legislation and administrative action. This view leads to List's scheme of industrial politics. Every nation should begin with free trade, stimulating and improving its agriculture by trade with richer and more cultivated nations, importing foreign manufactures and exporting raw products. When it is economically so far advanced that it can manufacture for itself, then protection should be used to allow the home industries to develop, and save them from being overpowered by the competition of stronger foreign industries in the home market. When the national industries have grown strong enough that this competition is not a threat, then the highest stage of progress has been reached; free trade should again become the rule, and the nation be thus thoroughly incorporated with the universal industrial union. What a nation loses in exchange during the protective period, it more than gains in the long run in productive power. The temporary expenditure is analogous to the cost of the industrial education of the individual.

In a thousand cases the power of the State is compelled to impose restrictions on private industry. It prevents the ship owner from taking on board slaves on the west coast of Africa, and taking them over to America. It imposes regulations as to the building of steamers and the rules of navigation at sea, in order that passengers and sailors may not be sacrificed to the avarice and caprice of the captains. [...] Everywhere does the State consider it to be its duty to guard the public against danger and loss, as in the sale of the necessaries of life, so also in the sale of medicines, etc.

Railways
List was the leading promoter of railways in Germany. His proposals on how to start up a system were widely adopted. He summed up the advantages to be derived from the development of the railway system in 1841:
 It is a means of national defence: it facilitates the concentration, distribution and direction of the army.
 It is a means to the improvement of the culture of the nation. It brings talent, knowledge and skill of every kind readily to market.
 It secures the community against dearth and famine, and against excessive fluctuation in the prices of the necessaries of life.
 It promotes the spirit of the nation, as it has a tendency to destroy the Philistine spirit arising from isolation and provincial prejudice and vanity. It binds nations by ligaments, and promotes an interchange of food and of commodities, thus making it feel to be a unit. The iron rails become a nerve system, which, on the one hand, strengthens public opinion, and, on the other hand, strengthens the power of the state for police and governmental purposes.

List drew up proposals for a national railway network before the first steam locomotive ran between Nuremberg and Fürth. He suggested construction of a railway between Leipzig and Dresden which would soon become Germany's first long distance railway. He is honored for his early promotion of the importance of railways with a bust in Leipzig main station as well as several streets named after him adjacent to railway stations (e.g. Friedrich-List-Platz). When the Swiss-German architect :de:Martin Mächler first proposed what is today Berlin main station in 1917, he suggested the new central interchange station of the German rail network be named in honor of List.

Britain and world trade
While List once had urged Germany to join other 'manufacturing nations of the second rank' to check Britain's 'insular supremacy', by 1841 he considered that the United States and Russia would become the most powerful countries—a view also expressed by Alexis de Tocqueville the previous year. List hoped to persuade political leaders in England to co-operate with Germany to ward off this danger. His proposal was perhaps not so far-fetched as might appear at first sight. In 1844, the writer of an article in a leading review had declared that 'in every point of view, whether politically or commercially, we can have no better alliance than that of the German nation, spreading as it does, its 42 millions of souls without interruption over the surface of central Europe'.

The practical conclusion which List drew for Germany was that it needed for its economic progress an extended and conveniently bounded territory reaching to the seacoast both on north and south, and a vigorous expansion of manufacture and trade, and that the way to the latter lay through judicious protective legislation with a customs union comprising all German lands, and a German marine with a Navigation Act. The national German spirit, striving after independence and power through union, and the national industry, awaking from its lethargy and eager to recover lost ground, were favorable to the success of List's book, and it produced a great sensation. He ably represented the tendencies and demands of his time in his own country; his work had the effect of fixing the attention, not merely of the speculative and official classes, but of practical men generally, on questions of political economy; and his ideas were undoubtedly the economic foundation of modern Germany as applied by the practical genius of Bismarck.

List considered that Napoleon's 'Continental System', aimed just at damaging Britain during a bitter long-term war, had in fact been quite good for German industry. This was the direct opposite of what was believed by the followers of Adam Smith. As List put it: I perceived that the popular theory took no account of nations, but simply of the entire human race on the one hand, or of the single individual on the other. I saw clearly that free competition between two nations which are highly civilised can only be mutually beneficial in case both of them are in a nearly equal position of industrial development, and that any nation which owing to misfortunes is behind others in industry, commerce, and navigation ... must first of all strengthen her own individual powers, in order to fit herself to enter into free competition with more advanced nations. In a word, I perceived the distinction between cosmopolitical and political economy.

List's argument was that Germany should follow actual English practice rather than the abstractions of Smith's doctrines:

Had the English left everything to itself—'Laissez faire, laissez aller', as the popular economical school recommends—the [German] merchants of the Steelyard would be still carrying on their trade in London, the Belgians would be still manufacturing cloth for the English, England would have still continued to be the sheep-farm of the Hansards, just as Portugal became the vineyard of England, and has remained so till our days, owing to the stratagem of a cunning diplomatist. Indeed, it is more than probable that without her [highly protectionist] commercial policy England would never have attained to such a large measure of municipal and individual freedom as she now possesses, for such freedom is the daughter of industry and wealth.

Influences
List's hostility to free trade was first decisively shaped by the ideas of his friend Adolphe Thiers and other liberal protectionists in France. He was also later influenced by Alexander Hamilton and the American School rooted in Hamilton's economic principles, including Daniel Raymond, but also by the general mode of thinking of America's first Treasury Secretary, and by his strictures on the doctrine of Adam Smith. He opposed the cosmopolitan principle in the contemporary economical system and the absolute doctrine of free trade which was in harmony with that principle, and instead developed the infant industry argument, to which he had been exposed by Hamilton and Raymond. He gave prominence to the national idea and insisted on the special requirements of each nation according to its circumstances and especially to the degree of its development. He famously doubted the sincerity of calls to free trade from developed nations, in particular Britain: Any nation which by means of protective duties and restrictions on navigation has raised her manufacturing power and her navigation to such a degree of development that no other nation can sustain free competition with her, can do nothing wiser than to throw away these ladders of her greatness, to preach to other nations the benefits of free trade, and to declare in penitent tones that she has hitherto wandered in the paths of error, and has now for the first time succeeded in discovering the truth.

His idea of productive powers was influenced by the philosophy of productivity of Friedrich Wilhelm Joseph Schelling. He was acquainted with Robert Schumann and Heinrich Heine.

Legacy 

List's principal work is entitled Das Nationale System der Politischen Ökonomie (1841) and was translated into English as The National System of Political Economy.

Before 1914, List and Marx were the two best-known German economists and theorists of development, although Marx, unlike List, devised no policies to promote economic development.

This book has been more frequently translated than the works of any other German economist, except Karl Marx.

He is credited with influencing Nazism in Germany, and his ideas are credited as forming the basis of the European Economic Community.

In Ireland he influenced Arthur Griffith of Sinn Féin and these theories were used by the Fianna Fáil government in the 1930s to instigate protectionism with a view to developing Irish industry.

Among others he strongly influenced was Sergei Witte, the Imperial Russian Minister of Finance, 1892–1903. Witte's plan for rapid industrialisation was centred around railroad construction (the Trans-Siberian railroad for example) and a policy of protectionism. At the time, it was largely considered that Russia was a backward country with an under developed economy. The boom which was seen during the 1890s was largely credited to Witte's policy.

Angus Maddison noted that: As Marx was not interested in the survival of the capitalist system, he was not really concerned with economic policy, except in so far as the labour movement was involved. There, his argument was concentrated on measures to limit the length of the working day, and to strengthen trade union bargaining power. His analysis was also largely confined to the situation in the leading capitalist country of his day—the UK—and he did not consider the policy problems of other Western countries in catching up with the lead country (as Friedrich List did). In so far as Marx was concerned with other countries, it was mainly with poor countries which were victims of Western imperialism in the merchant capitalist era.

Heterodox economists, such as Ha-Joon Chang and Erik Reinert, refer to List often explicitly when writing about suitable economic policies for developing countries. List's influence among developing nations has been considerable. Japan has followed his model.

The international economic policy of Meiji Japan was a combination of Hideyoshi's mercantilism and Friedrich List's Nationale System der politischen Ökonomie.

It has also been argued that Deng Xiaoping's post-Mao policies were inspired by List, as well as recent policies in India.

China, under Deng, took on the clear features of a 'developmental dictatorship under single-party auspices.' The PRC would then belong to a class of regimes familiar to the 20th century that have their ideological sources in classical Marxism, but better reflect the developmental, nationalist views of Friedrich List.

A 1943 German film The Endless Road portrayed List's life and achievements. He was played by Eugen Klöpfer.

See also 

 Abraham Lincoln
 Contributions to liberal theory
 Economic interventionism
 Economic patriotism
 Henry Charles Carey
 Siegfried Moltke, a biographer of List's

Works in English translation

References

Bibliography

Books and book chapters
 
 (dissertation)
 

 
 
 (doctoral dissertation)
 

, containing a bibliography and a reprint of List's Petition on Behalf of the Handelsverein to the Federal Assembly (1819), Outlines of American Political Economy (1827), Philadelphia Speech (1827) (to the Harrisburg Convention), and the Introduction to The National System of Political Economy (1841).

Articles

External links 

 A Comparison Of List, Marx and Adam Smith
 Quotations From List
 Wikiquote - Quotations From List
 Union Europe — List's vision of a peaceful union
 An unfinished review of The National System of Political Economy written by Karl Marx in 1845 
 

1789 births
1846 deaths
People from Reutlingen
People from the Duchy of Württemberg
Academic staff of the University of Tübingen
Members of the Württembergian Chamber of Deputies
Historical school economists
19th-century German  economists
German development economists
German emigrants to the United States
1840s suicides